or  is a Latin phrase, meaning "with a turned thumb", that is used in the context of gladiatorial combat. It refers to a hand gesture or thumb signal used by Ancient Roman crowds to pass judgment on a defeated gladiator.

The precise gesture described by the phrase pollice verso, and its meaning, are the subject of scholarly debate.

According to Anthony Corbeill, a classical studies professor who has extensively researched the practice, thumbs up signalled killing the gladiator while "a closed fist with a wraparound thumb" meant sparing him.

Ancient Rome

The exact gesture described by the phrase  is unclear. From historical, archaeological, and literary records it is uncertain whether the thumb was turned up, turned down, held horizontally, or concealed inside the hand to indicate positive or negative opinions.

Juvenal uses verso pollice in the Satires:

Prudentius mentions the thumb gesture (converso pollice), used by a Vestal virgin who delights in the carnage:
{|
||style="padding-left:2em;"|Then on to the gathering in the amphitheatre passes this figure of life-giving purity and bloodless piety [the Vestal], to see bloody battles and deaths of human beings and look on with holy eyes at wounds men suffer for the price of their keep. There she sits conspicuous with the awe-inspiring trappings of her head-bands and enjoys what the trainers have produced. What a soft, gentle heart! She rises at the blows, and every time a victor stabs his victim’s throat she calls him her pet; the modest virgin with a turn of her thumb bids him pierce the breast of his fallen foe so that no remnant of life shall stay lurking deep in his vitals while under a deeper thrust of the sword the fighter lies in the agony of death.
|}

In popular culture
The notion of the  thumb signal was brought to modern popular attention by an 1872 painting by French history painter Jean-Léon Gérôme entitled Pollice Verso (usually translated into English as Thumbs Down). It is a large canvas that depicts the Vestal Virgins signifying to a murmillo that they decree death on a fallen gladiator in the arena. The picture was purchased from Gérôme by U.S. department-store magnate Alexander Turney Stewart, who exhibited it in New York City, and it is now in the Phoenix Art Museum in Arizona.

The painting almost immediately kicked off a controversy over the accuracy of Gerome's use of the thumbs-down gesture by spectators in the Colosseum. A 26-page pamphlet published in 1879, "Pollice Verso": To the Lovers of Truth in Classic Art, This is Most Respectfully Addressed, reprinted evidence for and against the accuracy of the painting, including a letter dated 8 December 1878 from Gérôme himself. Gérôme's painting greatly popularized the idea that thumbs up signaled life, and thumbs down signaled death, for a defeated gladiator. The gesture is used in many movies about Ancient Rome, including the 2000 film Gladiator, in which the Roman emperor Commodus uses a thumbs-up to spare the life of the film's hero, Maximus. is also the title of a controversial 1904 drawing of the Crucifixion by Australian artist Norman Lindsay, depicting Christ being rejected by nude pagans.

References

Further reading
 Anthony Corbeill. "Thumbs in Ancient Rome: Pollex as Index" in Memoirs of the American Academy in Rome 42, 1997, pp. 61–81.
 Anthony Corbeill. Nature Embodied: Gesture in Ancient Rome, Princeton University Press, 2004. 978-0-691-07494-8
 Desmond Morris. Gestures: Their Origin and Distribution, 1979.

External links
 "Pollice Verso": To the Lovers of Truth in Classic Art, This is Most Respectfully Addressed, 26-page pamphlet published in 1879 reprinting evidence for and against the accuracy of Gérôme's painting, including a letter dated 8 December 1878 from Gérôme himself.
 "Pollice Verso", article by Edwin Post in American Journal of Philology'', Vol. 13, No. 2 (1892), pp. 213–225, online at LacusCurtius
 "The Gladiator and the Thumb"
 "Pollice Verso" at Phoenix Art Museum

Ancient Roman culture
Gladiatorial combat
Latin words and phrases
Hand gestures